Art Madrid is a contemporary art fair organized by the company Arte y Asociados in Madrid since the year 2006 and that agrees in the time with ARCO (the International Fair of Contemporary Art).  In terms of number of galleries, it is the second largest contemporary art fair in Spain.

In its third annual event, Art Madrid 80 galleries of modern art and contemporary art were present - 59 of them from Spain and 21 international.

In 2007 23,000 visitors and 20 million Euros in sales were surpassed.

Arte y Asociados, Art Madrid's organizing company, is launching the first edition of FIART Valencia, the "International Fair of Modern and Contemporary Art of Valencia".  The fairgrounds will include 4,000 square meters of exhibition space and a projection of 50 participating galleries.

FIART Valencia will be held from September 25 to October 1, 2008, at the Feria de Valencia pavilions, coinciding with Habitat Valencia Forward, an event that includes the International Furniture Fair of Valencia and the International Decoration Fair which, in the last edition, received more than 80.000 professional visitors.

Galleries in Art Madrid 2008
 A. Cortina - Barcelona
 Ab - Antoni Botey - Barcelona
 Alba Cabrera - Valencia
 Aleph - Ciudad Real
 Alexandra Irigoyen - Madrid
 Angel Guido Art Project - Argentina
 Anquins - Reus
 Antonio Prátes - Portugal
 Art Lounge - Portugal
 Arte & Arte Gallery - Madrid
 Arte Privado - Argentina
 Artetrece - Madrid
 Atelier - Barcelona
 La Aurora - Murcia
 Barcelona - Barcelona
 Bat Alberto Cornejo- Madrid
 Beaux Arts Gallery – Miami (EE.UU.)
 Benlliure - Valencia
 Bennassar - Baleares
 Carlos Teixidó - Barcelona
 Carme Espinet - Barcelona
 Carmen Del Campo - Córdoba
 Clave - Murcia
 Comosmoarte - Alicante
 Cordeiros Galería - Portugal
 Cornión - Asturias
 Del Cisne - Madrid
 Del Palau - Valencia
 El Museo - Colombia
 Felisa Navarro - Álava
 Flecha - Madrid
 Francesc Llopis - Barcelona
 Friends Art - Barcelona
 Gabriel Vanrell - Baleares
 Galiano - Cuba
 Gallery Bandi - Corea
 Gallery Lazar Vujic - Eslovenia
 Giart - Girona
 Gómez Turu Gallery - Barcelona
 Hispánica - Madrid
 Jordi Pascual - Barcelona
 Katuin - Holanda
 Levy - Alemania
 Lina Davidov - Francia
 Lorenart - Madrid
 Luis Burgos - Madrid
 Manel Mayoral - Barcelona
 Maneu - Baleares
 Marges U - Girona
 Marimón - Baleares
 Marita Segovia - Madrid
 Michael Schmalfuss - Alemania
 Mikel Armendia - Navarra
 Mito - Barcelona
 Múltiple - Madrid
 Muro - Valencia
 Nave Del Arte - Madrid
 Paloma Larroy - Madrid
 Perve - Portugal
 Pilares - Cuenca
 Praxis - Nueva York (EE.UU.)
 Preciado Fine Art – Miami (EE.UU.)
 Principal Art - Barcelona
 Punto - Valencia
 El Quatre - Barcelona
 Rafael Lozano - Madrid
 Raiña Lupa - Barcelona
 Rayuela - Madrid
 Rita Castellote - Madrid
 Rosalía Sender - Valencia
 Sao Mamede - Portugal
 Sen - Madrid
 Servando - Cuba
 Set Espai Dart - Alicante
 Tizas - Madrid
 Toulouse – Rio de Janeiro (Brasil)
 Trazos Gallery - Canadá
 Tres Punts - Barcelona
 Vali30 - Valencia
 Xanon - Bilbao

References

External links
 Art Madrid's official web page
 ArtVista - International Art Fairs Calendar 
 Madrid Contemporary Art Galleries Interactive Map

Spanish culture
Art fairs
2006 establishments in Spain
Recurring events established in 2006
Events in Madrid